Katni River is a river that flows through  the Katni District in the state of Madhya Pradesh, India. Located in the northeastern part of India.
The river was named after Katewa, a gotra of Jats now found in the state of Rajasthan. Katewa built a fort on the river's banks for the Janapada of Katewa during their rule of the area.

See also   
Katewa

References

Rivers of Madhya Pradesh
Katni
Rivers of India